Joseph F. Battle Jr. (1937 – March 9, 2001) was an American politician and judge who served as Republican mayor of Chester, Pennsylvania from 1979 to 1986 and judge on the Delaware County Court of Common Pleas from 1987 to 1999.

Career
Battle graduated from University of Pennsylvania Law School in 1962.  He worked as chair of the Chester Housing Authority and as city solicitor for Chester.

Battle was appointed interim mayor of Chester by the Chester City Council in 1979 when the previous mayor, John H. Nacrelli, resigned after being convicted of federal bribery and racketeering charges. Battle won reelection as mayor and served until 1986. Battle was replaced as mayor by Willie Mae James Leake, the first female and first African-American mayor of Chester, Pennsylvania.

Battle served as Delaware County Sheriff from 1986 to 1988.

In 1987, Battle was appointed judge on the Delaware County Court of Common Pleas by Robert P. Casey and was elected to a ten-year term in 1989.

Battle is interred at the Saints Peter and Paul Cemetery in Springfield, Pennsylvania.

See also
List of mayors of Chester, Pennsylvania

References

1937 births
2001 deaths
20th-century American judges
20th-century American politicians
Judges of the Pennsylvania Courts of Common Pleas
Mayors of Chester, Pennsylvania
Pennsylvania lawyers
Pennsylvania Republicans
University of Pennsylvania Law School alumni
20th-century American lawyers